Sandai is a 2008 Tamil-language action comedy film directed by Sakthi Chidambaram. The film stars Sundar C, Nadhiya, Namitha and Ramya Raj, while Vivek, Lalu Alex, and Mithun Tejasvi, among others, play supporting roles. The music was composed by Dhina with cinematography done by K. S. Selva Raj and editing by G. Sasikumar. The film was released on 21 March 2008.

Cast

Production 
It was announced in 2007 that Sundar C. will team up with Sakthi Chidambaram for an action comedy film. During the launch, the film was initially titled as Porukki, however as the title was said to be derogatory, the titles like Adhirudhula and Mahamagam were considered before the team preferred to name the film as Sandai.

Soundtrack 

Music is composed by Dhina and Released on T-Series.

Reception 
Rediff called it "illogical" and stated that "Just suspend all logic and reason before settling for this age-old mother-in-law/son-in-law battle movies on the lines of Poova Thalaiya and Mappillai." Behindwoods wrote "You need no introduction to the Shakthi Chidambaram brand of cinema- he makes movies purely for entertainment and most often they work. This time the director who had formerly specialized in Sathyaraj starrers has teamed up with Sundar C to provide Sandai." Sify wrote "Here is regressive piece of kitsch, with over-the-top loud performances. The plot degenerates into a farce in the second half of this tedious film as it tumbles to an all?s-well-that- concludes-well end". The Indian Express wrote, "One star for Sundar C. and one star for Shakthi Chidambaram for his fast paced narration".

References

External links 

2008 action films
2008 films
2000s Tamil-language films
Indian action films
2000s masala films
Films directed by Sakthi Chidambaram